Plattner is a surname. Notable people with the surname include:

Hannelore Plattner, 20th-century Austrian luger
Hasso Plattner (born 1944), German businessman, cofounder of the software company SAP AG
Karl Friedrich Plattner (1800–1858), German metallurgical chemist
Maria Plattner (born 2001), Austrian association football player

See also
Fürst-Plattner Rule
Hasso Plattner Institute
"The Plattner Story", a short story by H. G. Wells
Platner (disambiguation)

German toponymic surnames